Sri Lanka Sikhamani Thamotharam Somasekaram (22 September 1934 – 11 March 2010) was a leading Sri Lankan Tamil geographer and Surveyor General.

Early life and family
Somasekaram was born on 22 September 1934. He was educated at the Jaffna Hindu College.  After school he joined the University of Ceylon, Colombo from where he graduated in 1956 with a BSc degree.

Somasekaram married Sathanithi. They had three children (Damayanthi, Jayanthi and Arjun).

Career
After university Somasekaram joined the Government Survey Department as an Assistant Superintendent of Surveys. A year later he joined Fitzwilliam College, Cambridge in 1958 to study the Part II course in geography, which he completed in 1959. On returning to Ceylon he rejoined the Survey Department. He became Superintendent of Surveys in 1967, Assistant Surveyor General in 1971 and Deputy Surveyor General in 1973. The latter position made in head of the Institute of Surveying and Mapping.

Somasekaram joined the Ohio State University in 1976 on a United Nations Fellowship, graduating with an MSc in Geodesy and Cartography.

Somasekaram became Surveyor General in 1991. He came up with the idea of the Sri Lankan Atlas and chaired the committee charged with creating it. He was awarded the Sri Lanka Sikhamani title, a Sri Lankan national honour, in 1990 for this work.

Somasekaram was president of the Surveyors' Institute of Sri Lanka (1985–87) and the Sri Lanka Association for the Advancement of Science. In 1998 he was admitted as a fellow of the Royal Geographical Society and received an honorary doctorate from the University of Jaffna. He was vice-president of the Organisation of Professional Associations of Sri Lanka between 1985 and 1991 and a member of the Canadian Institute of Geomatics.

Later life
Somasekaram wrote a number of books after retirement. He died on 11 March 2010.

References

1934 births
2010 deaths
Alumni of Fitzwilliam College, Cambridge
Alumni of Jaffna Hindu College
Fellows of the Royal Geographical Society
Ohio State University alumni
People associated with the University of Jaffna
S
Sri Lanka Sikhamani
Sri Lankan Tamil geographers
Sri Lankan Tamil writers